Ab Baran Rural District is a rural district (dehestan) in Joulaki District, Aghajari County, Khuzestan Province, Iran. At the 2011 census, its population was 1,776 in 395 families. The rural district has 5 villages.

References 

Aghajari County